The 2015 Rhode Island Rams football team represented the University of Rhode Island in the 2015 NCAA Division I FCS football season. They were led by second year head coach Jim Fleming and played their home games at Meade Stadium. They were a member of the Colonial Athletic Association. They finished the season 1–10, 1–7 in CAA play to finish in last place.

Schedule

Game summaries

at Syracuse

at Albany

Harvard

at Maine

at Brown

Delaware

Richmond

at New Hampshire

Villanova

Stony Brook

at Towson

References

Rhode Island
Rhode Island Rams football seasons
Rhode Island Rams football